Polygona filosa is a species of sea snail, a marine gastropod mollusk in the family Fasciolariidae, the spindle snails, the tulip snails and their allies.

Description

Distribution

References

 Schubert, H.G. & Wagner, J.A. (1829) Neues Systematisches Conchylien- Cabinet Angefangen von Martini und Chemnitz. Vol. 12. Bauer & Raspe, Nürnberg, xii + 196 pp., pls. 214–237.
 Vermeij G.J. & Snyder M.A. (2018). Proposed genus-level classification of large species of Fusininae (Gastropoda, Fasciolariidae). Basteria. 82(4–6): 57–82

External links
 Gray, J.E. (1838). On some new species of quadrupeds and shells. Annals of Natural History. ser. 1, 1: 27–30

filosa
Gastropods described in 1829